Seppo Henrik Räty (born 27 April 1962) is a retired Finnish track and field athlete who competed in the javelin throw. He was a World Champion, having won gold in 1987. He was also an Olympic medalist (silver in 1992, bronze in 1988 and 1996). He was nicknamed Tohmajärven karhu ("The Bear of Tohmajärvi") and Tohmajärven tykki ("The Cannon of Tohmajärvi").

His personal best throw of 96.96 m, set in 1991, was one of his two  world records with the "new javelin" at the time, however this throw was made using a "Nemeth" javelin that was banned by the IAAF later that year. All records made using this javelin were retrospectively deleted as from 20.9.1991 but remain ratified world records recognised by the IAAF. His best throw with the current javelin is 90.60 m, achieved in 1992.

While in the process of winning the 1987 World Championships, Räty was the subject of an often repeated video of failure.  Räty tripped on the runway, his javelin throw sticking in the runway about 30 cm short of the foul line.  While an embarrassing throw for negative gain, in fact since he had not crossed the line it did not even count as a foul.

After retiring, Räty became a coach. He currently mentors another javelin thrower from Northern Karelia, Oona Sormunen.

Seasonal bests by year
1986 - 81.72
1987 - 83.54
1988 - 83.26
1989 - 83.92
1990 - 86.92
1991 - 96.96 (modified javelin)
1992 - 90.60
1993 - 85.68
1994 - 85.22
1995 - 87.68
1996 - 86.98
1997 - 82.22
1998 - 75.14
1999 - 79.47

References

External links
 
 

1962 births
Living people
People from Tohmajärvi
Athletes from Helsinki
Finnish male javelin throwers
Olympic athletes of Finland
Olympic silver medalists for Finland
Olympic bronze medalists for Finland
Athletes (track and field) at the 1988 Summer Olympics
Athletes (track and field) at the 1992 Summer Olympics
Athletes (track and field) at the 1996 Summer Olympics
World Athletics Championships athletes for Finland
World Athletics Championships medalists
European Athletics Championships medalists
Medalists at the 1996 Summer Olympics
Medalists at the 1992 Summer Olympics
Medalists at the 1988 Summer Olympics
Olympic silver medalists in athletics (track and field)
Olympic bronze medalists in athletics (track and field)
World Athletics Championships winners
20th-century Finnish people
21st-century Finnish people